The 1902 Cincinnati Reds season was a season in American baseball. The team finished with a record of 70–70, fourth in the National League,  games behind the Pittsburgh Pirates. In August, principal owner John T. Brush sold his interest in the Reds to a group headed by August "Garry" Herrmann.

Regular season 
After finishing in last place for the first time in team history with a 52–87 record in 1901, the Reds were hoping to return to respectability in 1902.

Despite the last-place finish, Cincinnati brought back manager Bid McPhee to lead the club. The team was relatively quiet during the off-season, as the only major changes were that Harry Steinfeldt returned to playing third base, while Erve Beck, who spent the 1901 season with the Cleveland Blues of the American League, took over at second base. Beck had hit .289 with six homers and 79 RBI with Cleveland.

Sam Crawford saw his production dip a bit after a breakout 1901 season, but he still batted .333 with three home runs and 78 RBI, while Jake Beckley continued his steady production, batting .330 with a team high five home runs and 69 RBI. Heinie Peitz had his best offensive season, hitting .315 with a homer and 60 RBI, while Cy Seymour hit .340 with two home runs and 37 RBI after his mid-season arrival from the Baltimore Orioles.

On the mound, Noodles Hahn was the ace of the staff once again, going 23–12 with an ERA of 1.77 in 36 starts, completing 35 of them. Bill Phillips went 16–16 with a 2.51 ERA in 33 starts, while Ed Poole, acquired by the Reds from the Pittsburgh Pirates early in the season, went 12–4 with a 2.15 ERA in 16 starts.

Season summary 
Cincinnati got off to a rough start, going only 4–12 in their opening sixteen games to quickly find themselves in seventh place, 10.5 games behind the Pittsburgh Pirates. The losses continued to pile up, and after a 27–37 start to the year, the Reds fired manager Bid McPhee, and replaced him with Frank Bancroft on an interim basis. Bancroft had last managed in the major leagues with the Indianapolis Hoosiers in 1889, and he managed the Providence Grays to a World Series title in 1884.

Cincinnati also began to make numerous player changes, as John Dobbs was sent to the Chicago Orphans for cash, and Erve Beck was released by the team. The Reds signed free agent Cy Seymour, who had been released by the Orioles after hitting .268 with three home runs and 41 RBI in 72 games with them. The Reds played better under Bancroft, as they went 9–7 when he was the manager, before the team named Joe Kelley as player-manager for the remainder of the season. Kelley was acquired by the Orioles during the season, where he hit .311 with a homer and 34 RBI in 60 games. With Kelley as the manager, the Reds finished the season strongly, going 34–26 in their last 60 games, to finish the year with a 70–70 record, good enough for fourth place in the National League; however, they were 33.5 games behind the first-place Pirates.

Season standings

Record vs. opponents

Roster

Player stats

Batting

Starters by position 
Note: Pos = Position; G = Games played; AB = At bats; H = Hits; Avg. = Batting average; HR = Home runs; RBI = Runs batted in

Other batters 
Note: G = Games played; AB = At bats; H = Hits; Avg. = Batting average; HR = Home runs; RBI = Runs batted in

Pitching

Starting pitchers 
Note: G = Games pitched; IP = Innings pitched; W = Wins; L = Losses; ERA = Earned run average; SO = Strikeouts

Other pitchers 
Note: G = Games pitched; IP = Innings pitched; W = Wins; L = Losses; ERA = Earned run average; SO = Strikeouts

Relief pitchers 
Note: G = Games pitched; W = Wins; L = Losses; SV = Saves; ERA = Earned run average; SO = Strikeouts

References

External links
1902 Cincinnati Reds season at Baseball Reference

Cincinnati Reds seasons
Cincinnati Reds season
Cincinnati Reds